Little Badminton is a village in South Gloucestershire, England.

The 1965 romantic drama movie Sky West and Crooked (known in the United States as Gypsy Girl) directed by John Mills and featuring Hayley Mills was filmed entirely in and around Little Badminton.

References

External links

Villages in South Gloucestershire District